Đorđe Đukić may refer to:

Đorđe Đukić (Vojvodina politician) (born 1948), former president of the executive council of Vojvodina
Đorđe Đukić (economist) (born 1952), Serbian economist and former politician
Đorđe Đukić (Army of Republika Srpska) (1934–1996), Lt. General in the Bosnian Serb army